William Downing may refer to:

William L. Downing, judge
William Downing (MP) for Orford (UK Parliament constituency)
Bill Downing  a.k.a. William F. Downing, Wild West outlaw